The 1976 New Hampshire gubernatorial election was held on November 2, 1976. Incumbent Republican Governor Meldrim Thomson Jr. defeated Democratic nominee Harry V. Spanos with 57.66% of the vote.

Primary elections
Primary elections were held on September 14, 1976.

Democratic primary

Candidates
Carmen C. Chimento, American Independent Party candidate for the 1974 and 1975 United States Senate elections in New Hampshire
James A. Connor, former county attorney for Hillsborough County
Hugh J. Gallen, State Representative
Harry V. Spanos, former State Senator

Results

Republican primary

Candidates
Ralph Brewster
Meldrim Thomson Jr., incumbent Governor
Gerald J. Zeiller, former staffer to Senators Styles Bridges and Norris Cotton

Results

General election

Candidates
Harry Spanos, Democratic
Meldrim Thomson, Republican

Results

References

Bibliography
 
 
 

1976
New Hampshire
Gubernatorial
November 1976 events in the United States